1875 K Street is a mid-rise office building located in the United States capital of Washington, D.C. The building began construction in 2000, and was completed in 2001. The architect of the building was Hartman-Cox Architects, who designed the postmodern design of the building. The building was sold to Shorenstein Properties in 2005 for $113 million.

Law firm Willkie Farr & Gallagher is the anchor tenant in the building. Foley Hoag also has its Washington office in this building, There also was a Così restaurant located in the building, which was replaced by a Protein Bar in 2014.

See also
List of tallest buildings in Washington, D.C.

References

External links
Official website

Office buildings completed in 2001
Office buildings in Washington, D.C.